Lieutenant-General Avraami Pavlovich Zavenyagin  (1 May 1901, in Uzlovaya – 31 December 1956; his first name is also sometimes given as Avram or Abraham) was a leading figure in the Soviet nuclear projects of the 1940s and 1950s.<ref
name= Miller>
    Richard Lee Miller, Under the cloud: the decades of nuclear testing, 1986
</ref>

Zavenyagin was made plant director of the Magnitogorsk Iron and Steel Works in August 1933 and served in that capacity until 1936 when he was appointed the assistant to the People's Commissar of Heavy Industry.

A protégé of Lavrenti Beria,<ref
    name= Miller/> Zavenyagin survived the purge after the death of Joseph Stalin because of a long friendship with Nikita Khrushchev, which dated back to the 1920s.  During the Khrushchev era, he headed the Ministry of Medium Machine Building, responsible for nuclear weapons production, for two years. He died of a heart attack in 1956.

References 

1901 births
1956 deaths
People's commissars and ministers of the Soviet Union
Recipients of the Order of Lenin
Stalin Prize winners
Heroes of Socialist Labour
Burials at the Kremlin Wall Necropolis
Commissars 3rd Class of State Security
National University of Science and Technology MISiS alumni
Academic staff of the National University of Science and Technology MISiS
Soviet lieutenant generals